Boston Township is one of 37 townships in Washington County, Arkansas, USA. As of the 2010 census, its unincorporated population was 392.

Geography

Cities, towns, villages
Floss
Odell
Skylight

Cemeteries
The township contains Dobbs Cemetery and Garrett Creek Cemetery.

Major routes
The township does not contain any state highways.

References

 United States Census Bureau 2008 TIGER/Line Shapefiles
 United States National Atlas

External links
 US-Counties.com
 City-Data.com

Townships in Washington County, Arkansas
Populated places established in 1838
Townships in Arkansas
1838 establishments in Arkansas